Gainsari is a constituency of the Uttar Pradesh Legislative Assembly covering the city of Gainsari in the Balrampur district of Uttar Pradesh, India.

Gainsari is one of five assembly constituencies in the Shravasti Lok Sabha constituency. Since 2008, this assembly constituency is numbered 292 amongst 403 constituencies.

Currently this seat belongs to Samajwadi Party candidate Shiv Pratap Yadav who won in last Assembly election of 2022 Uttar Pradesh Legislative Elections defeating Bhartiya Janata Party candidate Shailesh Kumar Singh by a margin of 5,837 votes.

Election results

2022

2017

References

External links
 

Assembly constituencies of Uttar Pradesh
Balrampur district, Uttar Pradesh